Raymond "Ray" Bates Buker, Sr. (August 27, 1899 – June 3, 1992) was an American track and field athlete who competed in the 1924 Summer Olympics. He was born in Foster, Rhode Island and died in Boca Raton, Florida. In the 1924 Olympics he finished fifth in the 1500 metres competition.

References

External links

1899 births
1992 deaths
American male middle-distance runners
Olympic track and field athletes of the United States
Athletes (track and field) at the 1924 Summer Olympics